Gualter Aurélio Oliveira Bilro (born 22 November 1985) is a Portuguese footballer who plays for Futebol Clube 11 Esperanças as a defensive midfielder.

He amassed Segunda Liga totals of 81 matches and two goals over three seasons, with Farense which he also represented at two other levels of Portuguese football. Abroad, he played in Iceland.

Club career
Bilro was born in Amadora, Lisbon District, and raised in the Algarve. He began his career as a youth with S.C. Farense, and completed his development at FC Porto.

Bilro spent his first nine seasons as a senior competing in the third and fourth divisions, in representation of C.D.R. Quarteirense, F.C. da Madalena, G.D. Lagoa, Louletano DC, C.D. Pinhalnovense, GD Beira-Mar and Farense. At the end of the 2012–13 season, he achieved promotion to the Segunda Liga with the latter club.

On 27 July 2013, Bilro made his debut as a professional, featuring the full 90 minutes in a 1–0 home win against C.D. Santa Clara in the first stage of the Taça da Liga. His maiden appearance in the second tier took place on 21 August, when he was booked and played the entire 0–0 draw away to Leixões SC. He scored his first goal in the competition on 7 December of the same year, helping the hosts defeat S.L. Benfica B 3–1.

Bilro left the Estádio de São Luís in June 2016, later remarking "It was great to play for Farense. I represented the club I love". During his stint, he was nicknamed Spartacus by his teammates and also acted as team captain.

Aged 31, Bilro joined Icelandic club Njarðvík FC in 2017 after a spell with S.R. Almancilense. During his short tenure, he won the 2. deild karla championship.

International career
Bilro was part of the Portuguese under-17 squad at the 2002 UEFA European Championship alongside Cristiano Ronaldo, in a group-stage exit in Denmark.

References

External links

1985 births
Living people
People from Amadora
Sportspeople from Lisbon District
Portuguese footballers
Association football midfielders
Liga Portugal 2 players
Segunda Divisão players
S.C. Farense players
Louletano D.C. players
C.D. Pinhalnovense players
GD Beira-Mar players
S.R. Almancilense players
Njarðvík FC players
Portugal youth international footballers
Portuguese expatriate footballers
Expatriate footballers in Iceland
Portuguese expatriate sportspeople in Iceland